Edward Tompkins (1815–1872) was an American lawyer. He is best known for endowing a chair at the University of California where he had been elected to the board of regents.

Background
Tompkins was born in 1815 in rural Paris Hill, New York. Tompkins enrolled in Union College in 1831 and joined Sigma Phi. Tompkins graduated, earned a law degree at Hamilton College, and practiced law in Binghamton, New York as a partner to Daniel S. Dickinson. Tompkins married a Quaker woman, Mary Cook, from Bridgeport, Connecticut. She died several years later. Tompkins moved to San Francisco, California in 1859 where he continued as a lawyer. In 1861 Tompkins married a sister of Henry Huntly Haight named Sarah, a woman 20 years Tompkins's junior. They established residence on the shores of Lake Merritt in Oakland. Tompkins was elected in 1869 to represent Alameda County in the California State Senate. In 1870 Tompkins, a self-described Constitutional Democrat, spoke in favor of ratification of the 15th Amendment and voted against a California Senate resolution opposing California's proposed ratification.

As a state senator Tompkins argued for the creation of the University of California as recommended by the previous governor, Frederick Low. The charter creating the university (then only an agricultural school) passed on March 23, 1868 and Tompkins was elected to a four-year term on the Board of Regents of the University of California later that same year. Upon Tompkins's death in 1872, his position on the board of regents was filled by his brother-in-law, former Governor Haight. Some of Tompkins's letters are archived with papers of his relatives at Bancroft Library.

Louis Agassiz Chair
Tompkins endowed the school's chair of Oriental Languages and Literature named for Louis Agassiz on September 18, 1872 only months before Tompkins died. Tompkins's interest in Oriental studies grew out of his anticipation of expanded trans-Pacific commerce. Tompkins said that he felt "deeply the humiliation" of seeing Asian students go to the East Coast "in search of that intellectual hospitality that we are not yet enlightened enough to extend to them."

Notes

References

Citations

Bibliography

1815 births
1872 deaths
Union College (New York) alumni
Hamilton College (New York) alumni
People from Paris, New York
University of California regents
Democratic Party California state senators
19th-century American politicians
19th-century American lawyers